The Simpsonville Methodist Church is a historic church on First Street in Simpsonville, Kentucky.  It was built in 1876 and added to the National Register in 1988.

The first church on this location was built in 1840;  it had elevated pews and 32 members in 1842.  This church was built in 1876 as the Methodist Episcopal Church South for cost of $7500.  It had 210 members during 1877–1880.

See also
Simpsonville Christian Church, also NRHP-listed

References

Methodist churches in Kentucky
National Register of Historic Places in Shelby County, Kentucky
Gothic Revival church buildings in Kentucky
Churches completed in 1876
19th-century Methodist church buildings in the United States
Churches in Shelby County, Kentucky
Churches on the National Register of Historic Places in Kentucky
1876 establishments in Kentucky
Southern Methodist churches in the United States